Taiyuanjie is a station on Line 1 of the Shenyang Metro. The station opened on 27 September 2010.

Station Layout

References 

Railway stations in China opened in 2010
Shenyang Metro stations